John Bond (fl. 1402) was an English politician.

He was a Member (MP) of the Parliament of England for Leominster in 1402. Nothing further on him has been found to have been recorded.

References

14th-century births
15th-century deaths
English MPs 1402